Anna Passey (born 28 August 1984) is an English actress, known for portraying Sienna Blake in the Channel 4 soap opera Hollyoaks. For her role as Sienna Blake, she won the award for Villain of the Year at the 2014 British Soap Awards.

Career
Passey graduated from the Bridge Drama School in London. Passey first started her career in the BBC documentary film The Last Flight to Kuwait in 2007 opposite Freddie Stroma. Later in 2011, she starred in the British drama film, A Landscape of Lies, as well as the 2012 film Saint Dracula 3D. In 2014, Passey appeared in The Smoke, which was released on 20 October 2014.

On 21 November 2012, Passey started playing the role of Sienna Blake in the Channel 4 soap opera Hollyoaks. Emily Lawrence was initially cast in the role, before Passey replaced her. Tina Campbell of the Metro praised Passey's portrayal and described Sienna as having various layers to her personality. She noted that a backstory consisting of a woman beating father, unhinged mother and long-lost brother left her normality doomed. She added that "despite her (many) flaws, you can’t help but love Sienna" and deemed her Hollyoaks best character. Katie Archer of BT described Sienna as appearing "sweet and innocent", but "on the inside, things are far uglier." MSN.com labeled the character a "barmaid [turned] psychopath". Viewers' perception of Sienna changed during her tenure. Passey told an Inside Soap reporter that Sienna gained sympathy following revelations about her long-lost daughter. For her role as Sienna, Passey won the Villain of the Year award at the 2014 British Soap Awards. She was nominated for Most Popular Newcomer at the 2014 National Television Awards, later receiving numerous nominations in the Serial Drama Performance category. Then in 2017 and 2018, she was nominated for Best Actress at the British Soap Awards. In 2019, alongside her role in Hollyoaks, Passey appeared in the Netflix series Free Rein, in the recurring role of Felicite.

Filmography

Awards and nominations

References

External links

 

1984 births
Living people
English film actresses
English television actresses
English soap opera actresses
People from Burton upon Trent